Maati is a 2018 Indian Bengali-language drama film directed by Saibal Banerjee and Leena Gangopadhyay and starring Adil Hussain & Paoli Dam in the lead role.

Synopsis 
Meghla finds out her grandmother had been killed in her ancestral home in East Pakistan by a trusted retainer of the family. Many years after the tragedy, Meghla goes back to Kutubdia to trace her roots and faces the murderer's family who now occupy her house.
'Maati' traces Meghla's trials with truth and humanity, while tackling issues of migration, human displacement and relationships.

Cast 
Adil Hussain as Jamil Hussain
Paoli Dam as Meghla Chowdhury
Sabitri Chatterjee as Amina, Jamil's mother
Shankar Chakroborty as Meghla's father
Laboni Sarkar as Meghla's mother
Chandan Sen as Satyabrata Chowdhury, Meghla's grandfather
Aparajita Adhya as Kumudini Devi, Meghla's grandmother
Koushik Roy as Jigir Ali
Monami Ghosh as Jiniya
Anusuya Majumdar as Dadi, Jiniya's grandmother
Rishi Koushik as Angshu, Meghla's boyfriend
 Bharat Kaul as Celina's father
 Sagarika Roy as Bina
 Goutam De as Jiniya's father
 Maya Ghosh as Jiniya's mother
 Suman Banerjee as Asif, Jiniya's husband
 Diganta Bagchi as Ranjit's father
 Rupsha Bhaduri as Celina
 Aniruddha Ghosh as Ranjit
 Manjushree Ganguly as Jamil's sister
 Debolina Mukherjee as Jiniya's friend
 Prapti Chatterjee  as Jiniya"s friend
 Debjani Chakraborty as Jiniya's friend
 Sonal Mishra as Jiniya's friend

Music 

The music and the background score is by Debojyoti Mishra.
The film comprises 7 tracks and the lyrics are written by Debojyoti Mishra, Anirban Mukhpadhyay, Rabindranath Tagore and Hason Raja. The album rights of the film were acquired by Zee Music Bangla.

References

External links 
 

2018 films
Bengali-language Indian films
2010s Bengali-language films
Indian drama films